Marcos Antônio Candido Ferreira Júnior (born 13 May 1995), commonly known as Marcos Júnior, is a Brazilian footballer who plays as a midfielder for Remo.

Career

Career statistics

Club

Notes

References

1995 births
Living people
Brazilian footballers
Association football midfielders
Bangu Atlético Clube players
Bonsucesso Futebol Clube players
Volta Redonda FC players
América Futebol Clube (RN) players
ABC Futebol Clube players
Paysandu Sport Club players
CR Vasco da Gama players
Campeonato Brasileiro Série A players
Campeonato Brasileiro Série B players
Campeonato Brasileiro Série C players
Campeonato Brasileiro Série D players
Footballers from Rio de Janeiro (city)